The Diocese of Christchurch is one of the thirteen dioceses and hui amorangi of the Anglican Church in Aotearoa, New Zealand and Polynesia. The Diocese covers the area between the Conway River and the Waitaki River in the South Island of New Zealand.

History
The Diocese of Christchurch was established in 1856 by the subdivision of the Diocese of New Zealand. Henry Harper, who arrived in Lyttelton on the Egmont on 23 December 1856, was the first bishop. The seat of the Bishop of Christchurch is at ChristChurch Cathedral in Christchurch. Before the Christchurch diocese was founded, it was intended that a bishop for the South Island would have his See at Lyttelton; see Thomas Jackson (Bishop-designate of Lyttelton).

List of bishops

Archdeacons
The Archdeaconry of Christchurch  dates to 1866 when Henry Jacobs became the first (apparently sole) Archdeacon of the diocese Jacobs resigned in May 1889 and was succeeded by Croasdaile Bowen, a brother of Charles Bowen. Bowen did not serve for long, as he had a stroke in November 1889 and died in January 1890.

Archdeacons of Christchurch
1902–1909 (res.): Alfred Averill, Vicar of St Michael and All Angels, Christchurch and Canon

The Archdeaconry of Akaroa dates back to at latest 1855, when Octavius Mathias was collated.

Archdeacons of Akaroa
1909–1910 (res.): Alfred Averill, Vicar of St Michael and All Angels, Christchurch and Canon (became Bishop of Waiapu)

The Archdeaconry of Rangiora existed in the second half nineteenth century, when the whole country had one diocese which was then split in 1856 by the subdivision of the Diocese of New Zealand.

In 1887, there were four archdeaconries: Jacob (by then also Dean) was still Archdeacon of Christchurch; Henry Harper was Archdeacon of Timaru and Westland; Benjamin Dudley of Rangiora and Edward Lingard of Akaroa

Archdeacons of Timaru
1945–1953 (res.): Walter Averill, Vicar of St Mary's, Timaru

References

External links

 Diocese of Christchurch

Religious organizations established in 1856
Christchurch
Anglican dioceses established in the 19th century
Christianity in Christchurch
1856 establishments in New Zealand